are posthumous Okinawan portraits. Although it is unknown when the tradition of portraiture first began in the area, Ryukyu developed a unique style during the 15th-19th centuries.
 
Ogoe were all painted in similar style; they all place the king in the center surrounded by high officials and other retainers, with the king much larger than the others to emphasize his power and authority.

In the past the portraits were painted directly onto the walls of the Enkaku-ji Buddhist Temple in Okinawa as murals but it is believed that owing to damage caused by fires to the temple, in 1717 the court artist to the Ryukyu Kingdom, converted all the portraits to wall hung scrolls or kakejiku.

In the same time, Majikina Ankō also came to Nakagusuku-udun to research these portraits.

During the 1945 Battle of Okinawa, eight employees of Nakagusuku-udun palace, including Maehira Bōkei, put the antiquities in  boxes and hid them in a gutter on the palace grounds. When the battle came to end and the Shuri castle was captured by the U.S. Army, Maehira came back to Nakagusuku-udun, found that the palace had burned to the ground and that all the boxes they had hidden were empty. Maehira thought that these ogoe most likely survived and were carried off.

These lost antiquities included the royal crowns, Omoro Sōshi, ogoe, and others. Omoro Sōshi was discovered in the United States a few years later, and returned to Okinawa in 1953; other antiquities were still not found. Since 2000, these lost 11 artifacts, including crowns, hibenfuku (皮弁服, ceremonial vestments worn by Ryukyuan kings), and ogoe, were listed in FBI National Stolen Art File.

References 

Okinawa Prefecture 
Ryukyu Kingdom
Japanese painting